Askartza is a village in Álava, Basque Country, Spain.

Demography
Askartza had a population of 59 inhabitants in 2010, a decrease of 2 over the previous year.

Geography
Askartza is located to the east of the municipality, at the foot of the A-132 road between the towns of Vitoria-Gasteiz, 6 km from the center, west and continuing east to Argandoña, Andollu and Santa Cruz de Campezo.

History
Askartza is one of 43 villages which joined Vitoria at different times and occasions and, when Cuadrilla de Añana segregated itself in 1840, Askartza remained within the Cuadrilla de Vitoria.

References

Populated places in Álava